Orhan Džepar (born 13 June 1996) is a Dutch professional footballer who plays as a winger for Eerste Divisie club MVV.

Club career

Go Ahead Eagles
Džepar was born in Eefde, Gelderland, to parents Sule and Amela who fled from the Bosnian War in the early 1990s. He played youth football for SP Eefde and FC Zutphen, before joining the Go Ahead Eagles academy in 2014. He made his professional debut in the Eerste Divisie for that club on 16 August 2015 in a game against Telstar, replacing Sander Duits in the 64th minute and heading in his first goal twelve minutes later in a 5–0 home win.

He was sent on loan to Telstar for the 2016–17 season in August 2016. At the end of the season he suffered a muscle strain.

Helmond Sport
On 26 June 2019, Džepar signed a two-year contract with Eerste Divisie club Helmond Sport. He made his debut for the club as a starter on the opening matchday of the 2019–20 season in a 1–1 home draw against FC Volendam. On 13 September he scored his first goal for the club in Helmond's 5–1 away loss to Cambuur.

MVV
On 14 July 2021, he joined MVV on a two-year contract. He scored on his competitive debut for the club which proved to be the winning goal in a 1–0 victory away at Jong Utrecht.

Personal life
Džepar studied engineering before being scouted by Go Ahead Eagles at age 18.

Career statistics

References

External links
 

1996 births
Living people
People from Lochem
Dutch people of Bosnia and Herzegovina descent
Association football midfielders
Dutch footballers
Go Ahead Eagles players
SC Telstar players
Helmond Sport players
MVV Maastricht players
Eerste Divisie players
Footballers from Gelderland